Productalius is a genus of moths of the family Crambidae. It contains only one species, Productalius tritaeniellus, which is found in Madagascar.

References

Natural History Museum Lepidoptera genus database

Crambinae
Crambidae genera